Ras is a surname with a variety of origins. In Dutch ras means "nimble, swift", but it is a patronymic surname: the archaic given name Ras, Raas, or Raes was short for Erasmus or was a derivative the Middle Dutch male name Razo. In Polish or Serbian the name is likely also patronymic, while in French the meaning "bare" or "shorn" may indicate a topographic name for someone who lived on bare or razed land. People with this surname include:

Barbara Ras (born 1949), American poet, translator and publisher
Eva Ras (born 1941), Serbian actress, writer, and painter
Hans Ras (1926–2003), Dutch professor of Javanese language and literature
Koos Ras (1928–2001), South African singer and comedian
Leopold Willem Ras (1760s–1823), Dutch merchant-trader and diplomat, opperhoofd in Dejima
Marthinus Nikolaas Ras (1853–1900), South African farmer, soldier, and gun-maker 
Maxime Ras (born 1988), French football striker
Radomir Stević Ras (1931–1982), Serbian painter, illustrator and designer
 (born 1994), Dutch ice hockey player

See also
Ireneusz Raś (born 1972), Polish politician
Jan Raas (born 1952), Dutch cyclist
Raes, Belgian surname of the same origin

References

Dutch-language surnames
Patronymic surnames